Sphingomonas desiccabilis  is a Gram-negative and non-motile bacterium from the genus of Sphingomonas which has been isolated from biological soil crusts in the Colorado Plateau in the United States. It has been sent on the International Space Station in 2019 and 2020 for the BioRock and BioAsteroid experiments, respectively.

References

Further reading

External links
Type strain of Sphingomonas desiccabilis at BacDive -  the Bacterial Diversity Metadatabase

desiccabilis
Bacteria described in 2007